Altars are an American Christian metalcore band from Colorado Springs, Colorado. The band started making music in 2010, with members, lead vocalist, Canaan Smith, guitarists, Seth Munson and Brock Williams, bass guitarist Mike Searle, and drummer, Ben Reno. The band released one extended play, Opposition, in 2011 with Strike First Records. Their first studio album, Conclusions, was released by Facedown Records in 2012. The subsequent album, Something More, was released in 2013 by Facedown Records.

Background
Altars is a Christian metal band from Colorado Springs, Colorado. Their members at its inception, in 2010, were lead vocalist, Canaan Smith, guitarists, Seth Munson and Brock Williams, bass guitarist, Mike Searle, and drummer, Ben Reno.

Music history
The band formed in 2010 and their first album was Opposition, an extended play that was released on July 19, 2011 by Strike First Records. They released a studio album, Conclusions, on June 5, 2012, with Facedown Records. Their subsequent studio album, Something More, released on May 14, 2013 by Facedown Records. Upon leaving Facedown Records, they released their second EP titled A Profound Respect for Life on January 6, 2015.

Members
Current
Canaan Smith - vocals
Seth Munson - guitar
Mike Searle - bass
Brock Williams - guitar
Ben Reno - drums

Discography
Studio albums
 Conclusions (June 5, 2012, Facedown)
 Something More (May 14, 2013, Facedown)
EPs
 Opposition (July 19, 2011, Strike First)
 A Profound Respect for Life (January 6, 2015, self released)

References

Facedown Records artists
2010 establishments in Colorado
Musical groups established in 2010
Strike First Records artists
Metalcore musical groups from Colorado
American Christian metal musical groups